Mehmet Nuri Ersoy (born 1968) is a Turkish businessman and current Minister of Culture and Tourism.

Mehmet Nuri Ersoy was born in Istanbul, Turkey in 1968. After completing his secondary education in the Deutsche Schule Istanbul, he studied Business Administration in English language at Istanbul University. In 1991, he founded the tourism company "Ersoy Turistik Servisleri" (ETS) together with his twin brother Murat. More companies in the tourism branch followed with "Voyage Hotels Group" in 1999, "Didim Tur" as part of the ETS in 2001 and the airline company AtlasGlobal, known as Atlasjet, joining the group of companies in 2004.

On July 9, 2018, the newly elected President of Turkey Recep Tayyip Erdoğan announced his cabinet of the new Turkish political system. Mehmet Nuri Ersoy was appointed Minister of Culture and Tourism.<ref name="a1"/

References

Living people
1968 births
Businesspeople from Istanbul
Deutsche Schule Istanbul alumni
Istanbul University alumni
Turkish businesspeople
Businesspeople in tourism
Ministers of Culture and Tourism of Turkey
Members of the 66th government of Turkey